The Chandler Award is presented by the Australian Science Fiction Foundation for "Outstanding Achievement in Australian Science Fiction". 

It is named in recognition of the contribution that science fiction writer A. Bertram Chandler made to Australian science fiction, and because of his patronage of the Foundation.

Unlike the Ditmars, this award is decided upon by a jury and, although nominally an annual award presented in conjunction with the Australian National Science Fiction Convention, is not necessarily presented every year.

The first Chandler Award was presented in 1992 to Van Ikin at the National Science Fiction Convention - SynCon '92.

Winners

References 

The Encyclopedia of Science Fiction, Peter Nicholls & John Clute, eds. London: Granada, 1979.
Reginald's Science Fiction & Fantasy Awards, by Daryl F. Mallett & Robert Reginald. San Bernardino, CA: The Borgo Press, 1991, 1993, 2013.

Australian science fiction awards
Science fiction awards